CipSoft GmbH is a German video game developer based in Regensburg. Founded in 2001, it is the developer of Tibia. As of January 2023, the company employs 95 people.

History 
CipSoft was founded on 8 June 2001 by Guido Lübke, Stephan Payer, Ulrich Schlott, and Stephan Vogler. The four had developed the game Tibia during their time at university and released it in 1997. After completing their studies, they founded CipSoft to continue the development of the game.

Games

Tibia 
Tibia is one of the first online role-playing games (MMORPG) ever created. It is the main product of CipSoft GmbH. On the islands of Tibia players discover a fantastic 2D world where they can go on virtual adventures. The main intention of the game is for the player to develop the character and to prove oneself as a knight, paladin, sorcerer or druid. The fact that Tibia is still based on 2D has never influenced the growth of the number of players. In 2008, Tibia was seen as one of the "8 best MMORPGs for Linux"

TibiaME
TibiaME is the first online role playing game for mobile phones. The story of TibiaME is inspired by the PC game Tibia. As a knight or a sorcerer, the players develop the skills of their selected characters. By exploring large varieties of areas, they will come upon exciting quests and dangerous dungeons where hundreds of players can set their forces together. Communicating and interacting with other players in a diplomacy is only one attractive aspect of TibiaME. The player can log out at any moment of the game and log in later.

Fiction Fighters 
Fiction Fighters was a new product, which became available in 2011, but was discontinued during its beta release due to massive lack of player's staying interest - despite a massive marketing campaign. It was an interactive 3D comic, where players entered a parallel comic universe. The players acted and interacted only in comic strips.

Panzer League 
Panzer League is mobile multiplayer online battle arena for tanks. To win the game you have to destroy your opponents and defense systems before blowing up. Matches last 5 to 10 minutes. The game is available for the Android and iOS devices.

References

External links 
 

Companies based in Regensburg
Software companies of Germany
Video game companies established in 2001
Video game companies of Germany